Bukit Malawati (Malawati Hill in English) is a hillfort located in Kuala Selangor, Malaysia. Managed by the Kuala Selangor Municipal Council, Bukit Malawati is a popular local tourist attraction. The hillfort's position holds strategic importance which sits at the river mouth of Selangor River that drains into the Strait of Malacca, with a vantage point of both the Strait and Sumatra, Indonesia. Some of Bukit Malawati's historical highlights include an old lighthouse, as well as the remains of Kota Malawati (Malay for Fort Malawati). Bukit Malawati also serves as the final resting place for three of Selangor's earliest Sultans.

History
The fort was first constructed by local Malays in the early 16th century at the behest of Tun Mahmud Shah of Malacca. Towards the end of the 17th century, Bugis settlers began to establish themselves in the West coast of the Malay Peninsula and installed Raja Lumu to be the first Sultan of Selangor in 1742, who styled himself as Sultan Salehuddin Shah. Sultan Ibrahim Shah, who succeeded Raja Lumu in 1778, had the fort further fortified as precautionary measures to defend against possible Dutch invasions. Nonetheless, Kuala Selangor still fell to the Dutch troops when they stormed the fort in 1784. Led by Dirk van Hogendorp, the fierce campaign was mounted as reprisal to the series of assaults waged by Sultan Ibrahim's ally, Raja Haji Fisabilillah, against A Famosa in Malacca, which was a Dutch stronghold at the time. Although Raja Haji was killed during the battle, the Dutch wanted retribution from Sultan Ibrahim Shah for providing him with naval support. The Dutch East India Company (VOC) then dispatched their fleet of vessels to Kuala Selangor to attack Sultan Ibrahim Shah. The advancing van Hogendorp's VOC armada battered the fort with their cannons from water for two weeks, driving Sultan Ibrahim Shah's forces into the nearby jungles. Sultan Ibrahim Shah himself fled to Bernam, and subsequently to Pahang. Following his flight, the Dutch captured the fort and renamed it Fort Altingburg in honour of Willem Arnold Alting, the Governor-General of the Dutch East Indies from 1780 to 1797. Later, Sultan Ibrahim would return to recapture the fort in 1785 with the aid of his brother, Dato' Penggawa Permatang Mahabijaya (Penggawa Tua), and Bendahara Adb. The fort was eventually destroyed during the Selangor Civil War.

Features
Bukit Malawati is located near other tourist attractions, such as Kampung Kuantan Firefly Park and Kuala Selangor Nature Park. Some of the popular attractions at the hillfort also include a tram ride, a royal mausoleum, and a museum.

Rumah Api Kuala Selangor (Kuala Selangor Lighthouse)
Also known as the Altingsburgh Lighthouse, the structure was originally built by the Dutch in 1794. It was extensively refurbished by the British in 1907 before it was officially reopened in 1910. The fully-functional lighthouse is now considered to be one of Bukit Malawati's defining features. Measuring at 83 metres from seabed and 27 metres from land, the lighthouse presently operates on electricity. It rotates and projects an intense beam of light that is visible up to 56 kilometres twice at every 15 seconds.

Batu Hampar (The Bedrock)
Measuring at 5x5x1 square feet, Batu Hampar is a large rock slab that was placed in the west of the courtyard. The bedrock was reportedly used for the purpose of executions, where traitors of the Sultan would be laid by their executioners for beheading. According to a local legend, the fourth Sultan of Selangor, Sultan Abdul Samad, would spend his evenings ruminating on the slab while watching the sunset.

Kota Malawati (Malawati Fort)
Cannons reinforced the ring of fortifications that encircled the fort, which was constructed by local villagers during the second Sultan of Selangor, Sultan Ibrahim Shah's rule in the 18th century.

Kuala Selangor Historical Museum
Not too far from the lighthouse, the local museum houses arrays of ancient weapons, dioramas, specimens of old currencies, and other collections of relics and artifacts. Visitors can learn about Kuala Selangor's local history, including its early settlement, fishing culture, and trading history from the exhibits.

Perigi Beracun (Poisoned Well)
Local history claimed that the Poisoned Well was used to torture traitors. Offenders would be placed inside the well, which would be filled with watery solution mixed with irritants, such as latex and bamboo shoots, up to chin-level as punishment. Today, curious visitors may view the well at close range, which has been covered with iron grates for health and safety to prevent unwanted mishaps.

Royal Mausoleum
The Royal Mausoleum (Malay: Makam Diraja Bukit Melawati) serves as the burial ground for the first three Sultans of Selangor - Sultan Salehuddin Shah, Sultan Ibrahim Shah, and Sultan Muhammad Shah, as well as their wives. The site is closed to the general public.

List of graves

Sultan graves

Sultan Salehuddin Shah- the first Sultan of Selangor (died:1778)

Sultan Ibrahim Shah- (died:27 October 1826)

Sultan Muhammad Shah- (6 January 1857)

Tengku Ampuan/Pemaisuri graves (Graves of Royal Consorts)

Che' Puan Besar Long Jalijah binti Dato' Husain -The first ever Che' Puan Besar of Selangor 1771 - ?

Tengku Ampuan Tengah binti Raja Haji-The first Tengku Ampuan of Selangor 1796 - 27 October 1826

Tengku Ampuan Basik binti Arung To' Mojong- Tengku Ampuan of  Selangor    ? - 6 January 1857

Tengku Ampuan Aftah Binti Al-Marhum Sultan Muhammad Shah-Tengku Ampuan of  Selangor 1844 - 1873

Royal family graves

Fauna
Bukit Malawati is home to the local silvered leaf monkeys and long-tailed macaques.  The silvered leaf monkeys at Bukit Malawati are accustomed to human presence, and are sometimes bold enough to approach visitors.  Tourists are discouraged from feeding the monkeys.

References

Nature sites of Selangor
Landforms of Selangor
Hill forts
Tourist attractions in Selangor